The Evans River is a short river in New Zealand's South Island. It arises near Mount O'Shanessy in the Kaimata Range of the Southern Alps and flows north-west and then south-west, joining the Crooked River several kilometres before the latter's outflow into Lake Brunner.

The river is on private land.

See also
 List of rivers of New Zealand

References

 Land Information New Zealand - Search for Place Names

Rivers of the West Coast, New Zealand
Rivers of New Zealand